Selce may refer to:

Croatia
 Selce, Croatia, a town in Primorje-Gorski Kotar County, Croatia

Slovakia
Selce, Banská Bystrica District, a municipality of the Banská Bystrica District, in Slovakia
Selce, Krupina District, a municipality of the Krupina District, in Slovakia
Selce, Poltár District, a municipality of the Poltár District, in Slovakia

Slovenia
 Dolenje Selce, a settlement in the Municipality of Trebnje
 Gorenje Selce, a settlement in the Municipality of Trebnje
 Selca, Železniki, a settlement in the Municipality of Železniki, formerly also known as Selce
 Selce, Lenart, a settlement in the Municipality of Lenart
 Selce, Litija, a settlement in the Municipality of Litija
 Selce, Lukovica, a settlement in the Municipality of Lukovica
 Selce nad Blanco, a settlement in the Municipality of Sevnica
 Selce, Pivka, a settlement in the Municipality of Pivka
 Selce pri Leskovcu, a settlement in the Municipality of Krško
 Selce pri Moravčah, a settlement in the Municipality of Moravče
 Selce pri Špeharjih, a settlement in the Municipality of Črnomelj
 Selce, Tolmin, a settlement in the Municipality of Tolmin
 Selce, Vojnik, a settlement in the Municipality of Vojnik
 Selce, Zagorje ob Savi, a former settlement in the Municipality of Zagorje ob Savi, now part of Tirna
 Spodnje Selce, a settlement in the Municipality of Šmarje pri Jelšah
 Zgornje Selce, a settlement in the Municipality of Šentjur

North Macedonia
Selce, Prilep, a village near Prilep Municipality
Selce, Tetovo, a settlement in Tetovo Municipality
Selce, Štip, a settlement in Štip Municipality
Selce, Kruševo, a settlement in Kruševo Municipality

See also
 Seltse (disambiguation) (Cyrl: Селце)
 Selca (disambiguation)
 Selci (disambiguation)
 Seoce (disambiguation)
 Seoca (disambiguation)